First Street Bridge may refer to:

First Street Bridge (Napa, California), listed on the National Register of Historic Places in Napa County, California
First Street Bridge (Merrill, Wisconsin), listed on the National Register of Historic Places in Lincoln County, Wisconsin